Declaration of Indulgence may refer to:

Declaration of Indulgence (1672) by Charles II of England in favour of nonconformists and Catholics
Declaration of Indulgence (1687) by James II of England granting religious freedom

See also
Indulgence